The Anthropological Papers of the University of Alaska is an academic journal published by the Department of Anthropology at the University of Alaska Fairbanks. It was established in December 1952 and 25 volumes appeared irregularly through 2000. A new series was begun in 2000;  5 volumes have been published in it.

Several key papers in Alaskan anthropology have appeared in the journal, including Edward Vajda's 2010 paper on the Dene–Yeniseian hypothesis. , the journal and back-issues are available in hard copy only; no electronic version is available.

The journal is abstracted and indexed in Anthropological Index Online. It should not be confused with the Alaska Journal of Anthropology, published by the Alaska Anthropological Association beginning in 2001.

References

External links
 
 

1952 establishments in Alaska
Anthropology journals
English-language journals
Publications established in 1952
Science and technology in Alaska
University of Alaska Fairbanks